Kawai Thermal Power Station is a coal-based thermal power plant located in Kawai village in Baran district Rajasthan. The power plant is operated by the Adani Power.

Capacity
This is located at NH 90 Kawai Atru main road district Baran. Kawai, Rajasthan
1320 MW (2 X 660 MW)

Kawai has a total installed capacity of 1320 MW and has the capability to expand in future. Kawai consists of 2x660 MW units.
For immediate connectivity, Kawai has a 1500m long air strip and is using state of the art technology for environment management.

Adani Power Limited (APL), executed a MoU with the
Government of Rajasthan (GoR) in March 2008, to set up a thermal power generation
project of 1200 MW (±10%) and sell at least 50% power in the State of Rajasthan
which later on, implemented long term PPA (21.01.2010) thru’ competitive bidding
process for supply of 1200 MW power to Rajasthan Discoms.

References

External links

Coal-fired power stations in Rajasthan
Baran district
2013 establishments in Rajasthan
Energy infrastructure completed in 2013